The automotive industry in South Korea is the fifth-largest in the world as measured by automobile unit production and also the sixth-largest by automobile export volume.

While its initial operations were merely the assembling of parts imported from foreign companies, South Korea is today among the most advanced automobile-producing countries in the world. Annual domestic output first exceeded one million units in 1988. In the 1990s, the industry manufactured numerous in-house models, demonstrating not only its capabilities in terms of design, performance, and technology, but also signalling its coming of age.

History

Origins
The history of the Korean automotive industry began in August 1955, when Choi Mu-seong, a Korean businessman, and two of his brothers (Choi Hae-seong and Choi Soon-seong), mounted a modified and localized jeep engine on a US military jeep-style car body made with the sheet metal from a junk oil drum can and military junk Jeep parts to manufacture its first car, called the Sibal (car). Sibal translates as new go or new start.

To develop the automobile industry, the Korean government announced an "Automobile Industry Promotion Policy" in 1962, and The Automobile Industry Protection Act to protect the infant industry. Foreign automakers were barred from operating in Korea, except in joint ventures with local business entities. The government's efforts led to companies that were established in other businesses entering the industry, and the formation of new startups. Three companies were established in 1962: Kyeongseong Precision Industry, which changed its name to "Kia Industry", and started assembling cars in cooperation with Mazda in 1962; Dongbang Automobiles, which was merged with Ha Dong-hwan Workshop and became Ha Dong-hwan Automobile Industry Co. (the predecessor of SsangYong Motor Company) in 1963; and
Saenara Automobile, established with the technical cooperation of Nissan Motor Co.; it was the first automaker in Korea that was equipped with modern assembly facilities, and acquired by Shinjin Industries in 1965. The Asia Motors Company was established in 1965, and the Hyundai Motor Company in 1968 with the technical cooperation of the Ford Motor Company. However, all these companies were then merely automotive assemblers, importing parts from overseas partners.

1970 to 1990
In 1970, Toyota began to show hesitation in continuing its relationship with Shinjin Automobiles. After Toyota's withdrawal in 1972, Shinjin entered into a joint venture with General Motors and formed General Motors Korea, which was renamed Saehan Motors in 1976. Kia opened its Sohari Plant in 1973 in Gwangmyeong, South Korea.

The Hyundai Pony, the first Korean-developed automobile, was built in 1975. Hyundai Motors accomplished this by engaging George Turnbull of British Leyland Motor Corporation as vice-president. The final result was a collaborative effort, comprising:

 design from Italdesign;
 transmission and engine from Mitsubishi;
 technology transfer (bodies) from Perkinson;
 car body molding from Ogihara Mold Company;
 machine press from France; and
 Funds from Barclays Bank and France Suez.

Hyundai chalked up another first when it exported the Pony to South America, in countries like Colombia, Venezuela and Ecuador between 1976 and 1982, making it the first Korean-developed car to be exported. In 1977, Motores Tecno in Costa Rica, became the first Hyundai distributor in Central America, where the Hyundai Pony pickup were sold.

In 1982, the Daewoo Group gained control of Saehan Motors, and changed its name to Daewoo Motors in 1983. However, the Korean automobile industry suffered greatly from the 1979 energy crisis, and the consequent local recession. The government took action to resolve this difficult situation in 1982 by implementing the "Automobile Industry Rationalization Policy", the objective of which was to prevent excessive competition between the four major domestic automakers: Hyundai Motors, Kia Industry, General Motors Korea, and Asia Motors. Additionally, the government postponed its import liberalization of automobiles.

Shinjin Jeep Motors, which was a subsidiary of Shinjin Motors, changed its name to Geohwa Co. in 1981, and was taken over by Dong-A Motor Co. (formerly Ha Dong-hwan Automobile Industry Co.) in 1985. In 1986, the company was renamed the SsangYong Motor Company.

While localization of auto parts was the major concern during the 1970s, developing mass production system for the export-oriented industry became the issue during the 1980s. Hyundai entered the United States market in 1986 with the Excel (as the Pony was known there), and set a record for selling the most automobiles in its first year of business in the United States compared with any other car brand – 126,000 vehicles. Fortune magazine nominated the Excel for the "Best Product 10" award, largely because of its low price.  However, the cars were of often low quality and broke down often.  This led to Hyundai having a poor reputation in the United States. With this initial success in the export market, the company began in 1989 to produce models, designed in-house and manufactured with its own technology, starting with the Sonata, a medium-sized sedan. The Sonata, nevertheless, still featured many Mitsubishi designs and parts.

1990 to present
Hyundai's cumulative exports to the U.S. exceeded one million in 1990. In 1992 its ScoupeTurbo won at the Pikes Peak Hill Climb Rally, and in 1993 its Elantra was selected as the "Best Car of 1993" in Australia. Hyundai's Accent earned Canadian Best Buy Award in 1995, and its Avante also won the Asia-Pacific Rally that year. Yet, amidst all the successes, trouble was brewing for Hyundai. However this was not it.

The Excel, although initially well received, gave Hyundai a bad image, as over time its faults became apparent. Also, in efforts to bring the costs down, its quality and reliability suffered. As time caught up with the poor reputation of Hyundai in the United States, sales dropped drastically, and car dealerships started abandoning their franchises.

Rather than drop out of the world's largest automotive market, Hyundai began investing heavily in the quality, design, manufacturing, and long-term research of its vehicles in 1998, and added a ten-year or 100,000-mile warranty to its vehicles in the United States. This effort paid dividends for Hyundai, and in 2004 the company tied with Honda for initial brand quality, second in the industry behind Toyota, in a survey conducted by J.D. Power and Associates.

Towards the end of the 20th century, however, the industry began to face tremendous pressures at home, with the domestic market growing at under five percent, and greater competition, both locally and abroad. With energy waste, air pollution, and traffic congestion becoming more chronic, the Korean government has imposed the heaviest vehicle excise duty on automobiles and gasoline among the major automobile-producing countries. In 1985, the number of vehicles registered in Korea was one million, but by 1995 the total had increased to eight million. In response to these pressures, Korean automakers have become more aggressive in terms of pricing and quality, and begun developing larger cars, and broadening their product ranges to meet diverse customer preferences.

Internal pressures at home have also forced Korean automobile manufacturers to venture aggressively into international markets. In the early 1990s, Daewoo Motors also began to expand heavily throughout the world. Until 1996, its cars were all based on General Motors' models. After the Asian financial crisis that started in 1997, it took over the troubled SUV specialist, SsangYong, in 1998, but ran into financial trouble in 1999.

Asia Motors was completely merged with Kia Motors Company (the new name for Kia Industry, changed in 1990) in 1999. Kia Motors had financial trouble in 1997, and helped push South Korea into the Asian financial crisis. Kia was subsequently acquired by Hyundai Motors in 1998.

Samsung's entry into the automobile industry was also ill-fated. Established in 1994, Samsung Motors, its car manufacture. started selling cars in 1998, just when South Korea was hit by the Asian financial crisis. Faced with financial difficulties, Samsung sold a seventy percent stake in the company to Renault in September 2000, and it was renamed Renault Samsung Motors. Samsung also ventured into the heavy vehicle market, founding Samsung Commercial Vehicles in 1996, although this second company filed for bankruptcy in 2000, ending the liquidation in 2002.

The purchase of Daewoo Motors by General Motors Corporation in 2002, and Hyundai's completion of a one billion dollar assembly plant in Alabama in 2005, are two major developments that will further drive the Korean automobile industry to focus on North America, its largest export market. The move to the U.S. makes Hyundai the sixth Asian automaker to build a U.S. factory, the third foreign maker to pick Alabama, and the sixth automaker to locate in the Southeastern United States since 1990. Now opening in 2009 is another U.S. factory that will be a twin to the Alabama factory.  It is located in West Point, Ga and will build KIA cars.

As the world leader in rechargeable battery production, South Korean manufacturers rely on imports for more than 60% of battery material, most of which comes from China. This leaves South Korea vulnerable to trade tensions and geopolitical shocks with China and other countries in the region.

Timeline

1950s
 1955: Choi Mu-seong, a Korean businessman and two of his brothers mounted an engine on a modified US Army Jeep body and chassis to manufacture the historic model, called "Sibal";
 Shinjin Industrial founded (precursor of Daewoo Motor);
 Hyundai Civil Works Company founded by Chung Ju-yung;
 Ha Dong-hwan Car Assembly Shop founded.

1960s
 1960: UNKRA funds $200,000 to Shinjin Industrial (LTD.) to build Busan Plant
 1961: Government established "Industrial Standardization Act" and announced "Transportation Business Act and Road Traffic Act".
 1962: Government established "5-Year Automobile Industry Plan", and announced the "Automobile Industry Protection Act";
 Saenara Automobiles founded, in technical cooperation with Nissan Motor Co.;
 Ha Dong-hwan Automobile Industry Co. founded;
 Kyeongseong Precision Industry changed its name to Kia Industry.
 1963: Shinjin Sinsungho launched.
 1964: Government announced the "Automobile Industry Comprehensive Promotion Plan";
 Kia Industry produced Mazda models under licensing;
 Kia T-600 Triple Truck launched.
 1965: Government announced "3-Year Automobile Localization Plan", with a goal to achieve 90% local content by 1967;
 Asia Motors Co. established;
 Shinjin Automobiles took over Saenara Automobiles and Shinjin Corona launched with 20% local content assmebled.
 1967: Shinjin Crown, Sinjin Truck, and Sinjin Ace launched.
 1967: Government announced the "Automobile Plant Permission Standards".
 1968: Hyundai Motor Co. founded, and established licensing agreement with Ford Motor Company;
 Hyundai Cortina, Hyundai Ford 20M, Hyundai Ford D-series, and Hyundai Ford DK-Series launched.
 Shinjin Publica first produced.
 1969: Government announced "Basic Plan for Automobile Industry Promotion".

1970s
 1970: Gyeongbu Expressway fully opened;
 Sinjin New Crown, Hyundai 0303 Benz bus, Kia Titan, and Kia Boxer launched;
 Toyota showed hesitation in continuing with Sinjin Automobiles.
 1972: Shinjin Automobiles joint-ventured with General Motors to form GM Korea, and launched Chevrolet 1700, based on Holden Torana model;
 Kia Brisa (1974–1982) (K303) launched, based on Mazda Familia model;
 Kia KB truck launched, based on Hino truck model;
 Sinjin Automobiles launched Jeep under licensing from American Motors;
 1973: Hyundai New Cortina launched.
 Kia opens the Sohari Plant in Gwangmyeong.
 1974: Government set goal of half a million vehicles to be built annually, with the announcement of the "Automobile Industry Promotion Plan";
 Sinjin Automobiles joint-ventured with American Motors on 50-50 basis to form Sinjin Jeep Company;
 GM Korea Rekord, based on Opel Rekord, launched.
 1975: Government established "Systematization Promotion Act" for medium and small enterprises in automobile industry;
 Hyundai Motor Co. established its own research institute, and produced Hyundai Pony, the first Korean-developed car, designed by ItalDesign and based on Mitsubishi technology. The car is imported to Britain, where Korean cars have never been sold before.;
 GM Korea's Camina launched, based on Holden Torana.
 1976: Hyundai Motor made Korean history by exporting the "Pony" to the Republic of Ecuador;
 Kia Industry took over Asia Motors Co.;
 GM Korea changed its name to Saehan Automobiles, and produced Saehan Gemini (based on Opel Kadett and Isuzu Gemini models), and Saehan Elf (based on Isuzu Elf);
 Hyundai truck launched, based on a Mitsubishi Fuso model; Hyundai HD1000, and Hyundai Vison also launched.
 1977: Ha Dong-hwan Automobiles changed its name to Dong-A-Motors.
 Saehan (SMC) BF101 bus launched
 1978: Hyundai Ford Cortina Mark IV, Hyundai Ford Cortina Mark V, and Hyundai Ford Granada launched;
 Saehan Rekord and Saehan Royale Salon, both based on Opel Rekord, also launched.
 1979: Shinjin Jeep Motor Co. changed its name to Shinjin Motor Company as the company became a domestic corporation;
 Kia Bongo truck launched.

1980s
 1980: Government announced integration of automobile industry.
 1981: Sinjin Automobiles changed its company name to Geohwa Company.
 1982: Hyundai Pony II and Hyundai FB buses, Kia Bongo van launched.
 1983: Saehan Automobiles changed its name to Daewoo Motor, while partnering with General Motors;
 Daewoo BV101 bus launched, based on Isuzu truck model.
 Daewoo Royale series launched;
 Hyundai Stellar launched;
 Hyundai Motors established Hyundai Auto Canada Inc.;
 Keohwa's Korando launched.
 1984: Hyundai Pony-Excel, and Hyundai Presto launched;
 Asia Combi launched.
 1985: Ministry of Commerce and Industry postponed import liberalization of automobiles;
 Dong-A Motor Co. took over Keohwa Co.;
 Kia Besta launched;
 Number of vehicles registered in South Korea exceeded one million.
 1986: Government designated automobile industry for rationalization, based on the "Industry Development Act";
 Government revised the "Road Transportation & Vehicle Act, and other related regulations;
 Dong-A Motor Co. took over Geohwa Co. and renamed it Ssangyong Motor Co.;
 Hyundai Excel, and Hyundai Presto AMX Model, launched and exported to United States;
 Hyundai Excel nominated by Fortune magazine for the "Best Product 10" award;
 Daewoo Le Mans, based on Opel Kadett, launched.
 1987: Government cancelled "Automobile Industry Rationalization Plan";
 Government introduced import liberalization of commercial vehicles between 1,000 and 2,000 c.c.;
 Transportation Ministry revised "Enforcement Decree of the Automobile Management Act";
 Kia Pride, Kia Concord, Asia Topic, and Kia Jumbo Titan launched;
 Hyundai Truck (new model), Hyundai Grace, Hyundai Porter, and Hyundai Mighty launched, based on Mitsubishi Delica, Mitsubishi Canter, and Fuso model.
 1988: Annual domestic automobile production volume exceeded one million units;
 Korea Automobile Manufacturers Association (KAMA) established;
 Hyundai named "Official Car" for the 1988 Summer Olympics;
 Hyundai Chorus and Hyundai Sonata (new model) launched;
 SsangYong Korando family launched.
 1989: Hyundai Motor completed construction of its plant in Bromont, Canada;
 Hyundai Sonata launched, using in-house design, but still featuring Mitsubishi technology;
 3Gen from Hyundai Excel, Hyundai Porter 1.25 ton launched;
 Kia Capital and Kia Wide-Bongo launched, along with Kia Motors's import model, Mercury Sable.

1990s
 1990: Hyundai's cumulative exports to the U.S. surpassed 1 million in 1990;
 Kia Industry changed its name to Kia Motors Co.;
 Hyundai Scoupe, and Hyundai Elantra launched.
 1991: Hyundai Sonata (new model) launched;
 Kia New Besta and Kia Towner launched;
 Daewoo Prince, Daewoo Brougham, Daewoo Tico, Daewoo Damas, and Daewoo LeMans (new model) launched.
 Kia enters the European market with exports of its Pride hatchback, derived from the Mazda 121 of 1987.
 1992: Hyundai Scoupe (new model) launched; ScoupeTurbo won at the "Pikes Peak Hill Climb Rally";
 Kia Sephia, and Kia Potentia launched.
 1993: Hyundai Elantra (new model launched), and was selected "Best Car of 1993" in Australia;
 Kia named "Official Car" for Daejeon Expo.
 1994: Samsung Motors founded.
 The Kia brand launched in the United States
 1995: Number of vehicles registered in South Korea exceeded eight million;
 Hyundai's Accent earned "Canadian Best Buy Award", and also won the "Asia-Pacific" Rally;
 First Seoul International Motor Show.
 Daewoo begins importing cars to Britain, aided by a revolutionary sales package where cars are sold directly to customers from the manufacturer rather than through a traditional dealer network.
 1997: Kia Motors went into financial trouble, and helped push South Korea into the Asian financial crisis.
 1998: Hyundai began investing heavily in quality, design, manufacturing, and long-term research, and added a 10-year or 100,000-mile warranty to its vehicles in the United States;
 Samsung Motors started selling cars;
 51% of Kia Motors acquired by Hyundai Motor;
 Daewoo Motors took over the troubled SUV specialist, SsangYong
 1999: Asia Motors completely merged with Kia Motors Company.

2000s
 2000: Samsung sold a 70% stake in Samsung Motors to Renault, and the company was renamed Renault Samsung Motors.
 Daewoo Motors divests of SsangYong Motor Company
 2002: Major assets of Daewoo Motors acquired by General Motors. The new company was named GM Daewoo.
 2004: Hyundai tied with Honda for initial brand quality, second in the industry behind Toyota, in a survey conducted by J.D. Power and Associates.
 Shanghai Automotive Industry Corporation (SAIC) acquires 49% of SsangYong Motor Company.
 2005: Hyundai completed construction of its $1 billion assembly plant in Montgomery, Alabama;
 GM Daewoo vehicles were exported under various GM brands (and Suzuki), but mostly as Chevrolets

2010s
2011: GM Daewoo renamed itself to GM Korea, and in March, all GM Daewoo products are sold in South Korea as Chevrolets.
2011: After the renaming of GM Korea, the Daewoo Damas and Daewoo Labo has not worn any marque.
2011: GM Korea developed a new Luxury brand called GM Alpheon.
2015: Hyundai launched new luxury brand called Genesis
2017: EES acquired TGM, formerly known as bus manufacturing department of Hanguk Fiber. And established Edison Motors.

2020s
2021: Kia Motors changed its name to 'Kia' and change their slogan as 'Movement that inspires'.
2021: Hyundai launched first EV brand's vehicle. Hyundai Ioniq 5.
2021: First Gwangju Global Motors product, Hyundai Casper began production.

Automobile manufacturers and products

Hyundai Motor Company

Genesis
Genesis G80
Genesis G90
Genesis G70
Genesis GV80
Genesis GV70
Genesis GV60

Ioniq
 Ioniq 5

Passenger cars

Accent/Verna (Discontinued in Korea)
Elantra/Avante
Grandeur/Azera
i10 (Not sold in Korea)
i20 (Not sold in Korea)
i30/Elantra Touring (Discontinued in Korea)
Hyundai i40 (Discontinued)
Sonata
Hyundai Veloster N

SUVs and vans

Entourage (Only in US; Discontinued)
ix20 (Discontinued)
Libero (Discontinued)
Porter
Santa Fe
Starex/Grand Starex (Discontinued)
Staria
Tucson
Nexo
Kona
Palisade
Casper (Made by Gwangju Global Motors (GGM))
Venue

Commercial vehicles

Hyundai Mighty II
Hyundai e-Mighty
Hyundai County
Hyundai Truck (8/25-ton truck)
Hyundai Super Truck 5ton/4.5ton (HD Series)
Hyundai Super Truck (HD Series)
Hyundai Aero Town
Hyundai Super Aero City
Hyundai Universe
Hyundai HD120
Hyundai HD160
Hyundai HD170
Hyundai HD260
Hyundai Xcient
Hyundai Elec City
Hyundai Pavise
Hyundai HD50S (Modern Jeepney; Only in Philippines)
Hyundai Hongtu (Only in China)

Kia Corporation

Passenger cars

Amanti/Opirus
Cadenza/K7
Ceed
K3/Forte/Cerato
Morning/Picanto
Rio
Spectra/Cerato
Stinger
Visto
K5
K8
K9

SUVs and vans

Ceres
Topic
Towner
Bongo/K-Series
Carens/Rondo (Discontinued)
Carnival/Sedona
Mohave
Niro
Sorento
Soul
Sportage
Telluride (Not sold in Korea)
Seltos
Ray

EV Lineup
EV6

Commercial vehicles

KB
Rhino/Wide Boxer
Trade
Boxer
AM Truck
AM Bus
Granbird     
Titan
Super-Titan
Jumbo-Titan
Granto
Combi
Cosmos
Pamax
Frontier

General Motors Korea (formerly Shinjin Motors/Saehan Motors/Daewoo Motors)

Buick Encore/Opel Mokka (subcompact SUV; 5-door wagon; export-only; discontinued)
Buick Encore GX (subcompact SUV; export-only)
Chevrolet Aveo/Sonic (supermini; 5-door hatchback, 4-door sedan; discontinued)
Chevrolet Bolt (compact electric; imported)
Chevrolet Camaro SS (sports car; imported)
Chevrolet Captiva (mid-size SUV; 5-door wagon; discontinued)
Chevrolet Colorado (midsize pickup truck; imported)
Chevrolet Cruze (compact car; 4-door sedan, 5-door hatchback and station wagon; discontinued)
Chevrolet Equinox (compact crossover; imported)
Chevrolet Malibu (mid-size car; 4-door sedan; Made in Korea)
Chevrolet Orlando (compact MPV; 5-door wagon; discontinued)
Chevrolet Spark (city car; 5-door hatchback; Made in Korea)
Chevrolet Tahoe (Full-size SUV; Imported. Online sold only)
Chevrolet Trailblazer (compact crossover; Made in Korea)
Chevrolet Traverse (midsize crossover; imported)
Chevrolet Trax (subcompact SUV; 5-door wagon; Made in Korea)
Damas/Labo (microvan, pickup; Discontinued)
GMC Sierra Denali (full-size pickup truck; imported)

Alpheon
Alpheon (discontinued)

SsangYong Motor Company

SUVs and vans
Rexton
Korando
Rodius/Stavic/Korando Turismo
Tivoli
XLV/Tivoli AIR

Pickup trucks
Musso/Musso Grand/Rexton Sports/Rexton Sports Khan
Actyon Sports (discontinued)

Renault Korea Motors

 Renault Samsung XM3
 Renault Samsung SM3 (discontinued)
 Renault Samsung SM3 Z.E. (discontinued)
 Renault Samsung SM5 (discontinued)
 Renault Samsung SM6
 Renault Samsung SM7 (discontinued)
 Renault Samsung QM3 (imported; discontinued)
 Renault Samsung QM6
 Renault Captur (discontinued)
 Renault Clio (imported; discontinued)
 Renault Master (imported)
 Renault Twizy (discontinued)
 Renault Zoe (discontinued)

Tata Daewoo

 Tata Daewoo Novus Series
 Tata Daewoo Prima Series
 Tata Daewoo The CEN (2020~Present)
 Tata Daewoo MAXEN (2022~Present)
 Tata Daewoo KUXEN (2022~Present)

Edison Motors
Hankuk Fiber Primerse
Edison Fi-bird 
Edison SMART
Edison SMART T1.0

Asia Motors

Proto Motors

Imports 
Most importers and distributors of foreign automotive marques in the South Korean market are members of the Korea Automobile Importers & Distributors Association (KAIDA). As of 2023, marques represented by the members of KAIDA are the following:

Audi
Bentley
BMW
Cadillac
Chevrolet (some models are imported)
DS
Ford
GMC
Honda
Jaguar
Jeep
Lamborghini
Land Rover
Lexus
Lincoln
Maserati
Mercedes-Benz
MINI
Peugeot
Polestar
Porsche
Rolls-Royce
Toyota
Volkswagen
Volvo 

The following commercial vehicle brands are also represented by members of KAIDA in South Korea:

Iveco
MAN
Mercedes-Benz
Scania
Volvo

There are also imported vehicles whose official distributors are not members of KAIDA.  As of 2022, the marques are:

Aston Martin
DFSK (compact commercial vehicles sold under the importer's brand, EV KMC)
Ferrari
Isuzu (commercial vehicles)
Koenigsegg
Lotus
McLaren
Pininfarina
Renault (Master vans are imported)
Tesla

Historically, the following makes were officially represented in South Korea:

Chrysler (1992-2017)
Citroën
Dodge (Caliber, Dakota)
Fiat
Huansu (sold as Kenbo 600)
Infiniti (2005-2020)
Lancia (1996-1997)
Mercury (Sable was co-branded by Kia from 1989 to 1996)
Mitsubishi (2008-2013)
Nissan (2008-2020)
Saab (1988-2009)
Subaru (2010-2012)
Suzuki (1997)

References

External links
 "Made in Korea", Brief History of Korean Automobiles
 Korean Automotive Industry in Transition, from DSpace at MIT
 ASIATalk Articles, in